The 2013–14 Súper Final Apertura was the final game that determined the champion of the Torneo de Apertura 2013-14 of Chile.

Universidad Católica played against O'Higgins, both teams arrived with the same number of points to the last match-day of the championship. The match was played on 10 December 2013, at the Estadio Nacional de Chile.

Was the first tiebreaker match or Súper Final in the Primera División de Chile history. In which, O'Higgins reached its first championship by winning 0:1, with a goal of the Argentine-Chilean Pablo Hernández.

Match

After a hard-fought championship title fight against Universidad Católica, both ended up the tournament tied on 39 points, forcing a tiebreaker match, after an amendment to the rules of the championship was made. Modifying the rule that the team who had a better goal difference if both teams had the same number of points would be crowned as the champion.

The match was played at the Estadio Nacional de Chile as a neutral pitch, and the referee chosen for the match was Jorge Osorio.

The match was played on December 10, 2013, with a crowded Estadio Nacional de Chile that witnessed O'Higgins winning its championship in history with a goal of one of its main players Pablo Hernández, who ultimately ended up in club history.

Road to the final

Note: In all results below, the score of the finalist is given first (H: home; A: away). These results only considered the regular phase of the tournament (round robin), consisting of 17 matchdays played since 26 July until 8 December 2013.

1. The match between Santiago Wanderers and O'Higgins finished with result 2:2, but the coach Ivo Basay put on the match 6 foreigners players, being punished with a 3-0 defeat against. 

2. The match between Universidad de Chile and Universidad Católica was suspended and finished with the result at the last minute of the game (0:1).

League table
After the 17 matches of the round robin

After the Súper Final

Details

Statistics

References

O'Higgins F.C. matches
Super